Tuxpan River may refer to:
 Tuxpan River (Veracruz), in Mexico
 Tuxpan River (Jalisco), in Mexico